
The Lake Homs Dam, also known as Qattinah Dam, is a Roman-built dam near the city of Homs, Syria, which is in use to this day.

History
Contrary to an older hypothesis which tentatively linked the origins of the dam to Egyptian ruler Sethi (1319–1304 BC), the structure dates to 284 AD when it was built by the Roman emperor Diocletian (284–305 AD) for irrigation purposes. With a capacity of 90 million m³, it is considered the largest Roman reservoir in the Near East and may have even been the largest artificial reservoir constructed up to that time. Remarkably, the reservoir has suffered very little silting since.

The 2 km long and 7 m high masonry gravity dam consists of a Roman concrete core protected by basalt blocks. The slightly pointed curvature of the dam follows the course of a long ridge of basalt and thus bears only superficial resemblance to an arch dam.

In 1938, the level of the dam was raised, increasing the volume of the artificial lake to 200 million m³.

See also 
Al-Rastan Dam – located downstream
List of Roman dams and reservoirs
Roman architecture
Roman engineering

References

Sources 

Dams in Syria
Ancient Roman dams
Gravity dams
Buildings and structures in Homs Governorate